Abdulhadi Nuaman (Arabic:عبد الهادي نعمان) (born 21 August 1996) is a Qatari footballer. He currently plays for Al-Markhiya.

External links

References

Qatari footballers
1996 births
Living people
Al Kharaitiyat SC players
Al Sadd SC players
Al-Markhiya SC players
Qatar Stars League players
Qatari Second Division players
Association football midfielders
Place of birth missing (living people)